State Route 22 (SR 22) is a  state highway located in southwestern Maine.  It serves the western suburbs of Portland, running from SR 35 in Buxton east into the city, where it ends at SR 77.

Junction list

References

External links

Floodgap Roadgap's RoadsAroundME: Maine State Route 22

022
Transportation in York County, Maine
Transportation in Cumberland County, Maine